The Flyweight (51 kg) competition at the 2018 AIBA Women's World Boxing Championships was held from 15 to 24 November 2018.

Draw

Preliminaries

Main draw

References

External links
Draw

Flyweight